Walter Sabatini (born 2 May 1955) is an Italian former football player turned director of football, who last worked as sporting director at Serie A club Salernitana.

Playing career
Sabatini made his professional debut with Perugia in 1973, playing at Serie B level with the Umbrian club. After a short stint at Varese, he was acquired by Roma in 1976, where he had the chance to make his Serie A debut. He successively returned at Perugia, where he was prevented from playing because of a muscular injury that did not allow him to play any games for two years, including a season with no appearances at Palermo. Since then, after two years of inactivity, Sabatini found himself out of the limelight, and spent the following years playing in the lower ranks of Italian professional football before retiring in 1984.

Coaching and non-playing career

Early years
In 1986, he returned to Perugia, this time as assistant coach in the youth system, and then being promoted youth sector chief in 1990, as well as first team assistant to head coach Paolo Ammoniaci.

In 1992, he went on to join Lazio, where he served as youth sector chief together with Giuseppe Dossena and Roberto Ottaviani. In 1994, he was appointed director of football of Triestina. In 1998, he left Triestina to become director of football at third division side Arezzo, with Serse Cosmi as head coach. Both men left Arezzo in 2000 to join Perugia.

Director of football at Lazio
In 2004, Sabatini left Perugia to become director of football of Lazio. He worked for four years at Lazio, and was instrumental in signing players such as Aleksandar Kolarov, Valon Behrami, Fernando Muslera, Stephan Lichtsteiner, Modibo Diakité, Ștefan Radu, Libor Kozák and Luis Pedro Cavanda.

Director of football at Palermo
In 2008, after his contract with Lazio expired, Sabatini went on to fill the same position at Palermo, penning a two-year contract with the rosanero club. He agreed a one-year extension to his contract in May 2010.

His most notable signings included Afriyie Acquah (who was signed as a totally unknown player at the age of 17), Abel Hernández, Josip Iličić (who was discovered during a UEFA Europa League qualifying game against Slovenian side Maribor), Michel Morganella, Javier Pastore, Matteo Darmian and Ezequiel Muñoz.

On 2 November 2010, Palermo confirmed Sabatini had resigned from his role as director of football of Palermo due to "strictly personal reasons."

Director of football at Roma
In the summer of 2011, Sabatini was hired by James Pallotta to replace Daniele Prade as Roma's sporting director. Over the course of three years, he rebuilt Roma and orchestrated the near-complete removal of all of the side's below-average players that carried high wages, previously brought in from the Franco Sensi era. He has also succeeding in signing Erik Lamela and Marquinhos, as well as their sales to Tottenham Hotspur and Paris Saint-Germain respectively for a significant profit in 2013. He then utilized the funds to purchase players Kevin Strootman, Gervinho, Morgan De Sanctis, Radja Nainggolan and Mehdi Benatia. One year later, all five signings played solid seasons for the club, though Benatia was later sold to Bayern Munich for €26 million, double the amount he was initially purchased for from Udinese.

With the funds, Sabatini managed to purchase three additional centerbacks in the summer of 2014, and was able to snatch Juventus's main target in the transfer window, Juan Iturbe, from Verona. For his efforts the season prior, Sabatini was awarded the best director of football award for the 2013–14 Serie A season. He was hitherto normally known for signing short-term deals, but for the first time he agreed upon a three-year extension with Roma in 2014.

Director of football at Inter and Jiangsu (Suning Sports Group) 
On 10 May 2017, Sabatini was officially announced by Suning as technical co-ordinator for both of their clubs: Inter and Jiangsu Suning.

On 28 March 2018, Sabatini resigned as technical co-ordinator at Inter and Jiangsu Suning.

Director of Football at Bologna and Montreal Impact  
On 17 June 2019 Sabatini was appointed director of football/technical director of  Bologna and Montreal. His departure from Bologna and Montreal was announced on 27 September 2021.

Director of Football at Salernitana  
On 14 January 2022 Sabatini has been appointed director of football/technical director of Serie A team Salernitana. Hired following a club takeover by entrepreneur Danilo Iervolino, Sabatini appointed Davide Nicola and signed more than ten players in the January transfer window in a last-ditched attempt to save the club from relegation. Thanks to a change in form by the end of the season, Salernitana escaped relegation in the final game of the season.

Despite informal announcements by club owner Iervolino stating his intention to confirm Sabatini, on 2 June 2022 Salernitana formally announced to have parted company with the sporting director due to disagreements with the board.

Personal life
Sabatini's brother Carlo Sabatini is also involved in football, having last served as head coach of Serie B club Padova, which he led to win the Lega Pro Prima Divisione playoffs during the 2008–09 season.

Sabatini is well known in Italy for his smoking habit. During a press conference at Suning Training Center in Milan, Italy, he notably asked for a pause while a journalist was asking him a question so he could go outside for a smoke. On 10 September 2018 Sabatini was rushed in the Intensive Care Unit at the Hospital of Rome, after having intense difficulty breathing and suffering a collapsed lung.

References

1955 births
Living people
People from Marsciano
Serie A players
A.S. Roma players
A.C. Perugia Calcio players
Palermo F.C. players
L.R. Vicenza players
Parma Calcio 1913 players
Association football midfielders
S.S.D. Varese Calcio players
Venezia F.C. players
Aurora Pro Patria 1919 players
Italian footballers
Sportspeople from the Province of Perugia
Footballers from Umbria